In music, major fourth and minor fifth are intervals from the quarter-tone scale, named by Ivan Wyschnegradsky to describe the tones surrounding the tritone (F/G) found in the more familiar twelve-tone scale, as shown in the table below:

Major fourth

A major fourth is the interval that lies midway between the perfect fourth (500 cents) and the augmented fourth (600 cents) and is thus 550 cents (F). It inverts to a minor fifth. Wyschnegradsky considered it a good approximation of the eleventh harmonic (11:8 or 551.32 cents). A narrower undecimal major fourth is found at 537 cents (the ratio 15:11). 31 equal temperament has an interval of 542 cents, which lies in between the two types of undecimal major fourth.

The term may also be applied to the "comma-deficient major fourth" (or "chromatic major fourth"), which is the ratio 25:18, or 568.72 cents (F).

Minor fifth

A minor fifth is the interval midway between the diminished fifth (600 cents) and the perfect fifth (700 cents) and thus 650 cents (G). It inverts to a major fourth. It approximates the eleventh subharmonic (G), 16:11 (648.68 cents).

The term may also be applied to the ratio 64:45 (G-) or 609.77 cents, formed from the perfect fourth (4/3 = 498.04) and the major semitone (16/15 = 111.73), which is sharp of the G tritone. The "comma-redundant minor fifth" has the ratio 36:25 (G), or 631.28 cents, and is formed from two minor thirds. The tridecimal minor fifth (13:9), or tridecimal tritone, is slightly larger at 636.6 cents.

Other
The term major fourth may also be applied to the follow, as minor fifth may be applied to their inversions (in the sense of augmented and diminished):
The "comma-deficient major fourth" (or "chromatic major fourth") is the ratio 25:18, or 568.72 cents (F).
45:32 (F+) or 590.22 cents, formed from the major third (5/4 = 386.31) and the major tone (9/8 = 203.91) or two major tones (9:8) and one minor tone (10:9)
729:512 (F++) or 611.73 cents, formed from the perfect fourth and the apotome.

See also
Subminor and supermajor
Neutral interval

References

Fifths (music)
Fourths (music)
Major intervals
Minor intervals
Quarter tones